The College of New Rochelle (CNR) was a private Catholic college with its main campus in New Rochelle, New York, but also in Australia, England, and Germany. It was founded as the College of St. Angela by Mother Irene Gill, OSU of the Ursuline Order as the first Catholic women's college in New York in 1904. The name was changed to the College of New Rochelle in 1910. The college was composed of four schools and became co-educational in 2016. In early 2019, Mercy College and College of New Rochelle announced that College of New Rochelle would be absorbed into Mercy College before fall 2019, including College of New Rochelle's students, faculty, programs, and some facilities, as well as transcripts, history, and legacy of CNR alumni. Mercy College became the repository of CNR documents.

On September 20, 2019, the college declared bankruptcy due to $80 million in liabilities. The campus was subsequently sold in an auction and purchased by New York Trustees of the Masonic Hall and Asylum Fund. The Trustees are entrusted with the maintenance and protection of certain assets of the Grand Lodge of Free and Accepted Masons of the State of New York including the Utica Masonic Care Community. The college site has been renamed to the Masonic Care Community of New Rochelle.

Academics
The College of New Rochelle was chartered by the Regents of the state of New York and was accredited by the Middle States Association of Colleges and Secondary Schools. The School of Nursing and Healthcare Professions was accredited by the Commission on Collegiate Nursing Education.

The college offered undergraduate degrees including Bachelor of Arts, Bachelor of Fine Arts, Bachelor of Science, Bachelor of Business Management and Bachelor of Science in Nursing. Graduate degrees offered by the college included Master of Arts, Master of Science, and Master of Science in education.

Of the faculty, 89% held doctoral degrees or the highest degree available in their field. The student-faculty ratio was 11:1.

Following the university model, the College of New Rochelle was composed of five separate schools:  School of Arts and Sciences; School of Nursing and Healthcare Professions;  School of Business; School of New Resources (for adult learners); and Graduate School.

Campus
In 1896, the college's founder, Mother Irene Gill, OSU, traveled to New Rochelle to explore the possibility of establishing a seminary there for young women. During this trip, she came across Leland Castle, an 1850s gothic revival structure and former vacation home of wealthy New York hotelier Simeon Leland. The castle was purchased in 1897 and became the first structure of the college. It has since been placed on the National Register of Historic Places. The castle was part of the campus quadrangle and housed the "Castle Gallery".

The campus consisted of 20 main buildings, including a $28M athletic, recreational, and educational complex called the Wellness Center (completed in 2008), which featured an NCAA competition-sized swimming pool, basketball court, fitness center, indoor running track, yoga studio, roof garden and meditation garden, and volleyball court; it also had the Mooney Center with computer and photography labs, and TV production studio; the 200,000-volume Mother Irene Gill Memorial Library; the Student Campus Center; the Rogick Life Sciences Building with many laboratories; four residence halls; and the Learning Resource Center for Nursing.

Athletics 
CNR athletic teams were the Blue Angels. The college was a member of the United States Collegiate Athletic Association (USCAA), primarily competing in the Hudson Valley Intercollegiate Athletic Conference (HVIAC) from 2004–05 to 2018–19.

CNR competed in 12 intercollegiate varsity sports: Men's sports included baseball, basketball, cross country, soccer and swimming; while women's sports included basketball, cross country, soccer, softball, swimming, tennis and volleyball.

Closure
On February 22, 2019, the college announced its intention to close at the end of summer 2019.  The college had failed to pay federal payroll taxes and owed the IRS an estimated $20 million.  Following that discovery, the college fired faculty and staff, resulting in a lawsuit from dismissed tenured faculty. A New York State judge ruled that those dismissals were improper. On March 28, 2019, the United States Securities and Exchange Commission (SEC) charged Keith Borge, the former controller of the college, with "defrauding municipal securities investors by fraudulently concealing the college's deteriorating finances." The U.S. Attorney's Office also brought criminal charges against Borge, who pleaded guilty. He was subsequently sentenced to three years in jail. The SEC did not file charges against the college because it cooperated with the investigation.

Later that same year, in September, the college declared bankruptcy as it had $80 million in liabilities. The campus and related materials were sold at auction and purchased by The Lodge Society Temple of New Rochelle for $32 million in a private real estate bankruptcy auction case.

Notable alumni
The College of New Rochelle's alumni were integrated into Mercy College's alumni community in 2019.

 Madeleine Blais, (b 1946), Pulitzer Prize–winning journalist and author
 Patricia Breslin, (1931–2011), American actress and philanthropist.
 Mary Donohue, (b 1947), retired Judge of the New York Court of Claims and a former two-term Lieutenant Governor of New York.
 Tamika Mallory, (b 1980), American activist. She was one of the leading organizers of the 2017 Women's March.
 Regina Peruggi, (b 1947), American educator who was President of Kingsborough Community College from 2005 to 2014, and first wife of Rudy Giuliani
 Mercedes Ruehl, (b 1948), Academy- and Tony Award–winning American screen and stage actor.
 Margaret C. Snyder, (1929–2021), American social scientist and founding director of the United Nations Development Fund for Women
 Anne Sweeney, (b 1957), American businesswoman, co-chair of Disney Media Networks and president of the Disney-ABC Television Group
 Patricia Ann Tracey, (b 1950), retired United States naval officer and the first woman to be promoted to the rank of vice admiral in the United States Navy.
 Dorothy Kilgallen, (1913 –1965), American journalist and What's My Line panelist.
 Paule Valery Joseph, American nurse and Fellow of the National Academy of Medicine

References

External links 

 
  - Mercy College

 
1904 establishments in New York (state)
2019 disestablishments in New York (state)
Defunct universities and colleges in New York (state)
College of New Rochelle
Educational institutions disestablished in 2019
Educational institutions established in 1904
Ursuline colleges and universities
Former women's universities and colleges in the United States